Men Into Space (a.k.a. Space Challenge in later US syndication) is an American black-and-white science fiction television series, produced by Ziv Television Programs, Inc., that was first broadcast by CBS from September 30, 1959, to September 7, 1960. The series depicts future efforts by the United States Air Force to explore and develop outer space. The series' star, William Lundigan, played Col. Edward McCauley.

Scenarios
Men Into Space was not set in a specified time period, but clues dropped in the scripts indicated that it took place between the mid-1970s and mid-1980s. The first Moon landing would have occurred circa 1975. Some props were futuristic (such as a forerunner of today's real-life LCD TVs), but the show's Earth clothing and environs, including automobiles, telephones, and other machines, were decidedly late 1950s. The program aired in the year just prior to the beginning of human spaceflight, with Vostok 1 and the Project Mercury launching crewed spacecraft in 1961.

Men Into Space was somewhat unusual for a TV action series in that it had numerous recurring characters, but only one protagonist, Col. Edward McCauley (William Lundigan), who was in all 38 of the series' episodes. Tyler McVey appeared in seven episodes as Major General Norgath. Ron Foster appeared five times as Lieutenant Neil Templeton. Joyce Taylor had a recurring role in eight episodes as Col. McCauley's wife, Mary McCauley.

McCauley was a sort of "everyman" character who was viewed in the show as the most experienced and illustrious astronaut. As depicted in the scripts, the low-key but decisive McCauley was ubiquitous, assigned to every important space mission over at least a decade, including the earliest human flights, the first flight to the Moon, many additional lunar landings and Moon base construction missions, construction of a space station, and two flights to Mars (neither succeeded, and folklore has it that plans for a never-aired second season would have focused on further missions to Mars and beyond).

In many episodes the astronauts were faced with accidents or technical problems that required innovation. The program was not idealistic; missions sometimes failed and astronauts sometimes died. For example, a scientist-astronaut stricken with a coronary thrombosis while exploring the Moon was not expected to survive the G-forces of the return flight, so his comrades stowed the space-suited patient in a steel drum filled with water, to cushion him during launch. A "Space Race" episode involved spacecraft from the USA and the USSR starting out almost simultaneously on the first Mars mission, with the American spacecraft aborting its effort in order to rescue the Soviet crew after their spacecraft experienced problems.

The series included an episode whose plot essentially paralleled the ill-fated Apollo 13 mission's explosion in space more than a decade later and another that was an uncanny foretelling of the accident that befell the real Gemini 8 mission in 1966.

Scripts often considered the human factor, and while action was the show's forte, humor and romance were part of the mix. Men Into Space predicted women astronauts and scientists, as well as married couples in space.

Episode list

Artwork
Men Into Space was advertised as being (for its era) an extremely accurate preview of human spaceflight, based on scientific studies  and buttressed by technical assistance from the USAF's ballistic missile and space medicine offices. The spacecraft designs, however, veered inconsistently between early 1950s Wernher Von Braun concept vehicles, and later on, totally scaled-down and more practical spacecraft proposals. Visual backdrops and conceptual designs of spacecraft, space stations, and a Moon base depended somewhat on contributions from notable astronomical and science fiction artist Chesley Bonestell.

The series also availed itself of extensive documentary footage of early missile launches, notably the Atlas missile. It evoked the earlier Disney space exploration documentaries, which in turn owed their look and feel to a widely read, early 1950s series on the subject in the old Collier's Weekly magazine, where Bonestell's art also held sway. At one point in production, a scale model and poster of an Atlas-derived missile design was built with the series spacecraft as its payload, with publicity photos of Lundigen holding the model in front of the large poster. Several scenes used footage from the canceled Navaho missile program to depict spacecraft landings on a desert runway. The distinctive design of the North American X-10 (different from the close up depictions of the series spacecraft) can be seen in the desert landing sequences.

Prediction of later technologies
Men Into Space used for its plots many technical and human problems anticipated by engineers and planners. For example, the show depicted attempts to refuel spacecraft by tanker in orbit, construction of a space telescope, an experiment to dispose of high level atomic waste by launching it into the Sun, the search for life-sustaining frozen Lunar water, and exploration and destruction of an asteroid whose orbit threatened Earth. In two different episodes, the series even speculated about exo-fossil extraterrestrial life discovered while exploring a distant asteroid and about ancient Earth-orbiting spaceship debris belonging to a non-human, space-faring civilization. Although the series was modestly budgeted, it was cleverly mounted with what, for its era, were very good special effects helmed by Louis DeWitt. Even decades later, the series can still be watched and appreciated for its attention to detail and accurate physics.

Scientific accuracy 
A narrator explained in nearly every episode why the astronauts needed magnetic boots to walk in or upon their free-falling spacecraft, how a jet thruster backpack could propel an astronaut through the vacuum of space, why a wrong angle of attack could doom a spacecraft upon atmospheric re-entry, and so forth. The spacecraft in the program were shown gliding to a powerless landing on a dry lake bed, just like the real Space Shuttle nearly 25 years later. Footage of these landings used documentary film of the SM-64 Navaho cruise missile landing at Edwards AFB.

On the other hand, dramatic license held sway on soundtracks, which repeatedly depicted sound in the airless vacuum of space: airlocks hummed, rockets roared, explosions boomed, and footsteps on the Moon's surface could be heard.  Spacesuits being worn by the actors did not expand when exposed to the vacuum of space, as they would later during actual space walks.

Production notes 
The program was produced by Ziv Television Programs, Inc., whose other notable series included Sea Hunt. The theme and recurring background music were written and conducted by David Rose. The series was produced by Lewis J. Rachmil.

Among the guest stars was Keith Larsen of the CBS series Brave Eagle and The Aquanauts. Joyce Taylor played the role of Mary McCauley in the series, but Angie Dickinson played the role in the original pilot episode. Other guest stars include James Best, Whit Bissell, Paul Burke, James Coburn, Paul Comi, James Drury, Joe Flynn, Arthur Franz, Nancy Gates, Allison Hayes, Murray Hamilton, Brett King, Werner Klemperer, Gavin MacLeod, Joe Maross, Donald May, Bek Nelson, Simon Oakland, Denver Pyle, Robert Reed, William Schallert, Warren Stevens, Marshall Thompson, Harry Townes, and Robert Vaughn.

Spacesuit costumes and special-effects footage of space vehicles (shot with miniature models) were later re-used in The Outer Limits, the science fiction film The Phantom Planet, and the 1969 drama Midnight Cowboy (the space opera playing on the movie screen during Joe Buck's tryst with a bespeckled young man is footage from Men into Space episode 1). The spacesuits also bore a strong resemblance to the spacesuits worn in the first half of the one-season comedy series It's About Time. The pilot episode used real, high-altitude pressure suits developed by the United States Navy, but most of the space suits used in the series were US Air Force designs.

In the UK Men Into Space was shown on the BBC as a children's series. It was programmed in an early Saturday evening slot that would later be filled by Doctor Who.

Novelization
A paperback novelization of the TV series, written by science fiction writer Murray Leinster, was published in 1960.

In popular culture
In the 1960s, Ideal Toy Company manufactured and sold a toy space helmet styled after the one worn by the main character, Colonel Ed McCauley.

References

External links
 
 
 

1959 American television series debuts
1960 American television series endings
1950s American science fiction television series
1960s American science fiction television series
Television series set in the 1970s
Television series set in the 1980s
Black-and-white American television shows
CBS original programming
Space adventure television series
English-language television shows
Television series about astronauts
Television series by MGM Television
Television series set in the future
Television series by Ziv Television Programs
Television series about the United States Air Force